Robert S. Alexander High School is a public high school in Douglasville, Georgia, United States. It is the third high school to open in the Douglas County School District.

History
Originally built to relieve overpopulation between Douglas County High School and Lithia Springs High School, Alexander High School opened for the 1986–1987 school year. The school's namesake, Robert S. Alexander, was a long-time employee of the Douglas County School System.

Due to high Advanced Placement enrollment and high test scores, Alexander High School was chosen as one of 100 schools worldwide for AP Capstone beginning in 2014.
In the 2021-2022 school year a student was stabbed and a gas leak as well as a power outage plagued the school

Athletics
Alexander High School teams are known as the Alexander Cougars and compete in the Georgia High School Association AAAAAA classification.

The boys' cross country team won the 2000 AAAA and the 2016 AAAAAA state championships.

The ALX Wrestling team has won the traditional state titles in 2010 and 2017, as well as the Dual State title is 2017.

Notable alumni
 Matt Capps, baseball player
 Austin Hill, racing driver

References

External links
Official Alexander HS website

Educational institutions established in 1986
Public high schools in Georgia (U.S. state)
Schools in Douglas County, Georgia
School buildings completed in 1986
1986 establishments in Georgia (U.S. state)
1980s architecture in the United States